CLG Naomh Ultan is a Gaelic football club in the villages of Bruckless and Dunkineely in the south of County Donegal, Ireland.

History

The club's 2020 Intermediate Championship campaign was suspended at the relegation play-off stage (a meeting with Naomh Colmcille) due to COVID, causing the 2021 Junior B Championship draw to be postponed and the 2021 Intermediate and Junior A Football Championship draws to have both teams in them due to the uncertainty of that result. Naomh Ultan began playing in Junior competition in 1975, their first match being against Glenfin who happened to be just starting up too. This game was played at Fintragh as the club's own pitch was not prepared in time for the start of the competition. The club colours were to be black and amber, the original colours of the club in Dunkineely prior to the foundation of Naomh Ultan.
The first adult trophy of any significance since the '50s was won in 1982, the Division 3 Shield. The club's first piece of Championship silverware since 1936 came in 1984 when they captured the first Intermediate title for the club, one year after the infamous league title victory after not dropping a single point in an entire season. On the day they defeated Kilcar on a scoreline of 1-5 to 0-5, Donal Cannon getting the all important goal and Liam Kennedy (0-3), Brendan McGready & John Quigley (0-1 each) all chipping in to raise aloft the cup.
In the late 1990's the club again had some league successes, most notably in 1997 were both Senior and Reserve sides won their leagues one year after a disastrous relegation. A proud year for the club as it also saw the opening of Naomh Ultan's new playing facilities on a day which saw Donegal play Roscommon to celebrate its opening. Naomh Ultan won the 2022 Donegal Junior B Championship.

Notable players
 Martin Shovlin — All-Ireland SFC winner

Managers

Honours
 Donegal Intermediate Football Championship (2): 1984, 2002
 Donegal Junior Football Championship (2): 1936, 2015
 Donegal Junior B Football Championship (1):2022

References

Gaelic games clubs in County Donegal
Gaelic football clubs in County Donegal